Miogallus is an extinct genus of large pheasant that lived during the Miocene of Europe. It contains a single species, Miogallus altus.

References

Phasianidae
Neogene birds of Europe
Miocene birds